

Arts and culture

Media

Military

Politics and activism

Sports

References

Glen Ellyn
Glen Ellyn